The following outline is provided as an overview of and topical guide to the Dominican Republic:

Dominican Republic – sovereign state occupying the eastern five-eighths of the island of Hispaniola, in the Greater Antilles archipelago in the Caribbean region. Its capital, Santo Domingo, was Western Europe's first permanent settlement in, and the first seat of Spanish colonial rule in the New World. For most of its independent history, the nation experienced political turmoil and unrest, suffering through many non-representative and tyrannical governments. Since the death of military dictator Rafael Leonidas Trujillo Molina in 1961, the Dominican Republic has moved toward representative democracy.

General reference
 Common English country :  The Dominican Republic
 Official English country name:  The Dominican Republic
 Comnon endonym(s):  
 Official indonym(s):  
 Adjectival(s): Dominican
 Demonym(s):
 Etymology: Name of the Dominican Republic
 International rankings of the Dominican Republic
 ISO country codes: DO, DOM, 214
 ISO region codes: See ISO 3166-2:DO
 Internet country code top-level domain: .do
 International rankings of the Dominican Republic

Geography of the Dominican Republic 

Geography of the Dominican Republic
 the Dominican Republic is: an island country
 Population of the Dominican Republic: 
 Area of the Dominican Republic: 48,670 km²
 Atlas of the Dominican Republic

Location of the Dominican Republic 
Location of the Dominican Republic – The Dominican Republic is located within the following regions or bodies of water:
 Northern Hemisphere and Western Hemisphere
North America (though not on the mainland) – Greater North America may be geographically subdivided into Northern America, Central America, and the Caribbean
 Atlantic Ocean
 North Atlantic Ocean
 West Indies – region comprising the Antilles and the Lucayan Archipelago, and surrounding waters
 Caribbean
Mar Caribe (Caribbean Sea)
 Caribbean Islands
Antillas (Antilles)
Antillas Mayores (Greater Antilles) –  comprise the four Caribbean islands of Cuba, Hispaniola, Jamaica, and Puerto Rico
La Española (Hispaniola) – an island, which it shares with Haiti
 Time zone:  Eastern Caribbean Time (UTC-04)

Locations within the Dominican Republic 
 Extreme points of the Dominican Republic
 High:  Pico Duarte  – highest point in the Caribbean
 Low: Lago Enriquillo  – lowest point on any ocean island
 Land boundaries:   360 km
 Coastline:  1,288 km

Environment of the Dominican Republic 

 Climate of the Dominican Republic
 Protected areas of the Dominican Republic
 Biosphere reserves in the Dominican Republic
 National parks of the Dominican Republic
 Armando Bermúdez National Park
 Cueva de las Maravillas National Park
 Parque Nacional Del Este
 El Choco National Park
 Jaragua National Park
 José del Carmen Ramírez National Park
 Los Haitises National Park
 Monte Cristi National Park
 Wildlife of the Dominican Republic
 Fauna of the Dominican Republic
 Amphibians of the Dominican Republic
 Birds of the Dominican Republic
 The Birds of Haiti and the Dominican Republic
 Insects of the Dominican Republic
 Butterflies of the Dominican Republic
 Mammals of the Dominican Republic
 Reptiles of the Dominican Republic
 Dominican slider – species of turtle
 Flora of the Dominican Republic

Natural geographic features of the Dominican Republic 
 Islands of the Dominican Republic
 Lakes of the Dominican Republic
 Lake Enriquillo
 Los Tres Ojos
 Lago de Oviedo
 Mountains of the Dominican Republic
 Rivers of the Dominican Republic
 Other geographic features
 Cape Engaño
 World Heritage Sites in the Dominican Republic
 Colonial City of Santo Domingo

Regions of the Dominican Republic 

 Geographic Regions of the Dominican Republic

Ecoregions of the Dominican Republic 

 Hispaniolan moist forests
 Hispaniolan pine forests

Administrative divisions of the Dominican Republic

Provinces of the Dominican Republic 

Provinces of the Dominican Republic – in alphabetical order:
 Distrito Azua
 Distrito Baoruco
 Distrito Alfredo Antonio Villa
 Distrito Dajabón
 Distrito Nacional
 Distrito Duarte
 Distrito Gucci
 Distrito Prada
 Distrito Orange
 Distrito Mirabal
 Distrito FENDI
 DistritoAltagracia
 Distrito Romana
 Distrito Vega
 Distrito Trinidad Sánchez
 Distrito Monseñor Nouel
 Distrito Cristi
 Distrito Plata
 Distrito VILLA BLANCO AMARILLO
 Distrito Peravia
 Distrito Puerto Plata
 Distrito Samaná
 Distrito Cristóbal
 Distrito San José de Ocoa
 San Juan Province
 Distrito San Pedro de Macorís
 Distrito Ramirez
 Santiago Province
 Distrito Antonio
 Distrito Alfredo Villa
 Distrito Valverde
 List of Dominican Provinces by date of provincehood
 Ranked list of Dominican provinces

Municipalities of the Dominican Republic 

 Municipalities of the Dominican Republic
 Capital of the Dominican Republic: Santo Domingo
 Cities of the Dominican Republic

Demography of the Dominican Republic 

Demographics of the Dominican Republic
 1950 Dominican Republic Census
 1960 Dominican Republic Census
 1970 Dominican Republic Census
 2010 Dominican Republic Census

Government and politics of the Dominican Republic 

Politics of the Dominican Republic
 Form of government: representative democracy
 Capital of the Dominican Republic: Santo Domingo
 Elections in the Dominican Republic
Republic World GOVERNMENT CENTRAL INSTITUTION  : 1924 • 1930 • 1934 • 1938 • 1942 • 1947 • 1952 • 1957 • 1962 • 1966 • 1970 • 1974 • 1978 • 1982 • 1986 • 1990 • 1994 • 2016
 Republic World GOVERNMENT CENTRAL INSTITUTION: 1998 • 2002 • 2006 • 2010
 Presidential elections:  1996 • 2000 • 2004 • 2008 • 2012
 Political parties in the Dominican Republic
 Major parties
 Dominican Liberation Party
 Modern Revolutionary Party
 Dominican Revolutionary Party
 Social Christian Reformist Party
 Minor parties
Alliance for Democracy
Broad Front
Christian Democratic Union
Christian People's Party
Dominican Humanist Party
Dominican Workers' Party
Green Socialist Party
Independent Revolutionary Party
Institutional Social Democratic Bloc
Liberal Party
National Civic Veterans Party
National Progressive Force
National Renaissance Party
National Unity Party
People's Democratic Party
Quisqueyano Christian Democratic Party
Revolutionary Social Democratic Party

Branches of the government of the Dominican Republic 

Government of the Dominican Republic

Executive branch of the government of the Dominican Republic 

 National Palace – main building of the executive branch, including the offices of the president and vice president
 Head of state: President of the Dominican Republic, Danilo Medina
 Head of government: President of the Dominican Republic, Danilo Medina
 Dominican presidential line of succession
 Presidents of the Dominican Republic
 Vice President of the Dominican Republic
 Cabinet of the Dominican Republic
 Ministries of the Dominican Republic
 Ministry of Economy
 Ministry of Finance
 Ministry of Higher Education, Science and Technology

Legislative branch of the government of the Dominican Republic 

 Congress of the Dominican Republic (bicameral)
 Upper house: Senate of the Dominican Republic
 Presidents of the Senate of the Dominican Republic
 Lower house: Chamber of Deputies of the Dominican Republic
 Presidents of the Chamber of Deputies of the Dominican Republic

Judicial branch of the government of the Dominican Republic 

Judiciary of the Dominican Republic
 Supreme Court of the Dominican Republic

Foreign relations of the Dominican Republic 

Foreign relations of the Dominican Republic
 Foreign Ministers of the Dominican Republic
 Dominican Republic passport
 Diplomatic missions in the Dominican Republic
 Diplomatic missions of the Dominican Republic
 Ambassadors from the Dominican Republic to Chile
 Ambassadors from the Dominican Republic to the United States
 Ambassadors of the United Kingdom to the Dominican Republic
 Dominican Republic–Haiti relations
 Dominican Republic–Mexico relations
 Dominican Republic–Taiwan relations
 Embassy of the Dominican Republic in Washington, D.C.
 Embassy of the Dominican Republic, London
 United States Ambassador to the Dominican Republic
 Heads of missions from the Dominican Republic
 Dominican Republic–United States relations
 Dominican Republic–Uruguay relations

International organization membership 
The Dominican Republic is a member of:

African, Caribbean, and Pacific Group of States (ACP)
Agency for the Prohibition of Nuclear Weapons in Latin America and the Caribbean (OPANAL)
Caribbean Community and Common Market (Caricom) (observer)
Central American Bank for Economic Integration (BCIE)
Central American Integration System (SICA) (associated member)
Food and Agriculture Organization (FAO)
Group of 77 (G77)
Inter-American Development Bank (IADB)
International Atomic Energy Agency (IAEA)
International Bank for Reconstruction and Development (IBRD)
International Chamber of Commerce (ICC)
International Civil Aviation Organization (ICAO)
International Criminal Court (ICCt)
International Criminal Police Organization (Interpol)
International Development Association (IDA)
International Federation of Red Cross and Red Crescent Societies (IFRCS)
International Finance Corporation (IFC)
International Fund for Agricultural Development (IFAD)
International Hydrographic Organization (IHO) (suspended)
International Labour Organization (ILO)
International Maritime Organization (IMO)
International Monetary Fund (IMF)
International Olympic Committee (IOC)
International Organization for Migration (IOM)
International Organization for Standardization (ISO) (correspondent)
International Red Cross and Red Crescent Movement (ICRM)

International Telecommunication Union (ITU)
International Telecommunications Satellite Organization (ITSO)
International Trade Union Confederation (ITUC)
Inter-Parliamentary Union (IPU)
Latin American Economic System (LAES)
Latin American Integration Association (LAIA) (observer)
Multilateral Investment Guarantee Agency (MIGA)
Nonaligned Movement (NAM)
Organisation for the Prohibition of Chemical Weapons (OPCW) (signatory)
Organization of American States (OAS)
Permanent Court of Arbitration (PCA)
Rio Group (RG)
Unión Latina
United Nations (UN)
United Nations Conference on Trade and Development (UNCTAD)
United Nations Educational, Scientific, and Cultural Organization (UNESCO)
United Nations Industrial Development Organization (UNIDO)
Universal Postal Union (UPU)
World Confederation of Labour (WCL)
World Customs Organization (WCO)
World Federation of Trade Unions (WFTU)
World Health Organization (WHO)
World Intellectual Property Organization (WIPO)
World Meteorological Organization (WMO)
World Tourism Organization (UNWTO)
World Trade Organization (WTO)

Law and order in the Dominican Republic 

Law of the Dominican Republic
 Constitution of the Dominican Republic
 Crime in the Dominican Republic
 Human trafficking in the Dominican Republic
 Human rights in the Dominican Republic
 Abortion in the Dominican Republic
 LGBT rights in the Dominican Republic
 Law enforcement in the Dominican Republic
 Dominican Republic National Police

Military of the Dominican Republic 

Military of the Dominican Republic
 Command
 Commander-in-chief: Danilo Medina
 Forces
 Army of the Dominican Republic
 Navy of the Dominican Republic
 Air Force of the Dominican Republic

Local government in the Dominican Republic 

 Provincial governors in the Dominican Republic

History of the Dominican Republic 

 History of the Dominican Republic

History of the Dominican Republic, by period 

 Prehistory of the Dominican Republic
 Chiefdoms of Hispaniola
 Captaincy General of Santo Domingo (1492–1795) – the island of Hispaniola came under Spanish tyranny starting with the arrival of Christopher Columbus. Most of the indigenous Taíno folk were wiped out by disease, enslavement, or war.
 Spanish reconquest of Santo Domingo (1808–1809) – war that resulted in España Boba
 Colonial governors of Santo Domingo
 French colony 1795–1809
 España Boba (1809–1821)
 Unification of Hispaniola (1822–1844) – Haiti control over the whole island
 La Trinitaria (1838–1844) – secret society leading the fight for independence from Haiti
 Dominican War of Independence (1844)
 First Republic (1844–1861)
 Spanish occupation of the Dominican Republic (1861–1865)
 Dominican Restoration War (1863–1865)
 Second Republic (1865–1916)
 Dominican Civil War (1911–12)
 Dominican Civil War of 1914
 United States occupation of the Dominican Republic (1916–24)
 Rafael Trujillo – ruled the Dominican Republic as dictator from 1930 to 1961
 Parsley Massacre
 1965 in the Dominican Republic
 Dominican Civil War (1965)
 1980 Dominican Embassy siege in Bogotá
 2013 Dominican Republic–Haiti diplomatic crisis

History of the Dominican Republic, by region 

 History of Santo Domingo – founded by Christopher Columbus' younger brother, Bartholomew Columbus, in 1496
 Timeline of Santo Domingo

History of the Dominican Republic, by subject 

 Earthquakes
 1946 Dominican Republic earthquake
 1984 San Pedro Basin earthquake
 2003 Dominican Republic earthquake
 Hurricanes
 1930 Dominican Republic hurricane
 Effects of Hurricane Georges in the Dominican Republic
 History of the Jews in the Dominican Republic
 LGBT history in the Dominican Republic
 Massacres in the Dominican Republic
 Wars involving the Dominican Republic

Culture of the Dominican Republic 

Culture of the Dominican Republic
 Architecture in the Dominican Republic
 Cathedrals in the Dominican Republic
 Lighthouses in the Dominican Republic
 Cuisine of the Dominican Republic
 Dominican rums
 Festivals in the Dominican Republic
 Carnival in the Dominican Republic
 Languages of the Dominican Republic
 National symbols of the Dominican Republic
 Coat of arms of the Dominican Republic
 Flag of the Dominican Republic
 National anthem of the Dominican Republic
 Demographics of the Dominican Republic
 Prostitution in the Dominican Republic
 Public holidays in the Dominican Republic
 Scouting and Guiding in the Dominican Republic
 World Heritage Sites in the Dominican Republic
 Colonial City of Santo Domingo

Art in the Dominican Republic 

 Artists from the Dominican Republic
 List of Dominican painters
 Cinema in the Dominican Republic
 Dominican Film Market
 Dominican Republic films
 Dance in the Dominican Republic
 Dominican salsa
 Literature of the Dominican Republic
 Music of the Dominican Republic
 National Symphony Orchestra
 Dominican rock

Beauty pageants in the Dominican Republic 

 Miss Dominican Republic
 By year: 1956 • 1957 • 1958 • 1962 • 1963 • 1964 • 1965 • 1966 • 1967 • 1968 • 1969 • 1970 • 1971 • 1972 • 1973 • 1974 • 1975 • 1976 • 1977 • 1978 • 1979 • 1980 • 1981 • 1982 • 1983 • 1984 • 1985 • 1986 • 1987 • 1988 • 1989 • 1990 • 1991 • 1992 • 1993 • 1994 • 1995 • 1996 • 1997 • 1998 • 2001 • 2002 • 2004 • 2005 • 2006 • 2007 • 2008 • 2009 • 2010 • 2011 • 2012 • 2013 • 2014 • 2015
 Miss Dominican Republic titleholders
 Miss Mundo Dominicana – 2003 • 2004 • 2005 • 2006 • 2007 • 2008 • 2009 • 2011
 Reina Nacional de Belleza Miss República Dominicana –  2005 •  2006 •  2007 •  2008 •  2009 •  2010
 Miss Tierra República Dominicana – 2004 •  2005 •  2006 •  2007 •  2008 •  2009 •  2010 •  2011
 Mister Dominican Republic

Languages in the Dominican Republic 

 Afro-Dominican
 Dominican Spanish

People of the Dominican Republic 

People of the Dominican Republic
 Diaspora of the Dominican Republic
 Dominican Americans   (list)
 Dominican Argentine
 Dominican people in Italy
 Dominicans in Spain
 Dominicans in Uruguay
 People in the Dominican Republic
 Ethnic groups in the Dominican Republic
 Afro-Dominicans
 Ethnic Chinese in the Dominican Republic
 Haitians in the Dominican Republic
 Indian community in the Dominican Republic
 Japanese settlement in the Dominican Republic
 People from the Dominican Republic
 Women in the Dominican Republic
 Youth in the Dominican Republic

Religion in the Dominican Republic 

Religion in the Dominican Republic
 Christianity in the Dominican Republic
 Cathedrals in the Dominican Republic
 The Church of Jesus Christ of Latter-day Saints in the Dominican Republic
 Episcopal Diocese of the Dominican Republic
 Evangelical Church of the Dominican Republic
 Protestantism in the Dominican Republic
 Roman Catholicism in the Dominican Republic
 Roman Catholic dioceses in the Dominican Republic
 Roman Catholic dioceses in the Dominican Republic by name
 Hinduism in the Dominican Republic
 Islam in the Dominican Republic
 Judaism in the Dominican Republic
 Dominican Vudú

Sports in the Dominican Republic 

Sports in the Dominican Republic
 Football in the Dominican Republic
 The Dominican Republic at the Olympics

Aquatics in the Dominican Republic 

 Dominican Republic at the 2013 World Aquatics Championships
 Dominican Republic at the 2011 World Aquatics Championships
 Dominican Republic at the 2015 World Aquatics Championships

Athletics in the Dominican Republic 

 Athletics Federation of the Dominican Republic
 Dominican Republic records in athletics
 Dominican Republic at the 2009 World Championships in Athletics
 Dominican Republic at the 2013 World Championships in Athletics
 Dominican Republic at the 2011 World Championships in Athletics
 Dominican Republic at the 2015 World Championships in Athletics

Baseball in the Dominican Republic 

 Dominican Republic national baseball team
 Dominican Summer League
 Dominican Summer League Angels
 Dominican Summer League Astros
 Dominican Summer League Athletics
 Dominican Summer League Blue Jays
 Dominican Summer League Braves
 Dominican Summer League Brewers
 Dominican Summer League Cardinals
 Dominican Summer League Cubs
 Dominican Summer League Diamondbacks
 Dominican Summer League Dodgers
 Dominican Summer League Giants
 Dominican Summer League Indians
 Dominican Summer League Mariners
 Dominican Summer League Marlins
 Dominican Summer League Mets
 Dominican Summer League Nationals
 Dominican Summer League Orioles
 Dominican Summer League Padres
 Dominican Summer League Phillies
 Dominican Summer League Pirates
 Dominican Summer League Pirates 2
 Dominican Summer League Rangers
 Dominican Summer League Rays
 Dominican Summer League Red Sox
 Dominican Summer League Reds
 Dominican Summer League Rockies
 Dominican Summer League Rojos
 Dominican Summer League Royals
 Dominican Summer League Tigers
 Dominican Summer League Twins
 Dominican Summer League White Sox
 Dominican Summer League Yankees 1
 Dominican Summer League Yankees 2
 Dominican Professional Baseball League – winter league of 6 teams
 List of Major League Baseball players from the Dominican Republic
 Dominican Republic women's national baseball team

Basketball in the Dominican Republic 

 Dominican Republic national basketball team
 Dominican Republic women's national basketball team

Field hockey in the Dominican Republic 

 Dominican Republic men's national field hockey team
 Dominican Republic women's national field hockey team

Football in the Dominican Republic 

Association football in the Dominican Republic
 Dominican Football Federation
 Football clubs in the Dominican Republic
 Dominican Republic national football team
 Dominican Republic national under-20 football team
 Dominican Republic women's national football team

Cycling in the Dominican Republic 

 Dominican records in track cycling
 Dominican Republic Cycling Federation
 Dominican Republic National Road Race Championships
 Dominican Republic National Time Trial Championships
 Dominican Republic at the 2009 UCI Road World Championships
 Dominican Republic at the 2012 UCI Road World Championships

Golf in the Dominican Republic 

 Dominican Republic Open

Handball in the Dominican Republic 

 Dominican Republic women's national beach handball team
 Dominican Republic men's national handball team
 Dominican Republic national beach handball team
 Dominican Republic women's national handball team

Martial arts in the Dominican Republic 

 Dominican Republic Taekwondo Federation

Dominican Republic at the Olympics 

Dominican Republic at the Olympics
 Dominican Republic Olympic Committee
 Flag bearers for the Dominican Republic at the Olympics
 Dominican Republic at the 1964 Summer Olympics
 Dominican Republic at the 1968 Summer Olympics
 Dominican Republic at the 1972 Summer Olympics
 Dominican Republic at the 1976 Summer Olympics
 Dominican Republic at the 1980 Summer Olympics
 Dominican Republic at the 1984 Summer Olympics
 Dominican Republic at the 1988 Summer Olympics
 Dominican Republic at the 1992 Summer Olympics
 Dominican Republic at the 1996 Summer Olympics
 Dominican Republic at the 2000 Summer Olympics
 Dominican Republic at the 2004 Summer Olympics
 Dominican Republic at the 2008 Summer Olympics
 Dominican Republic at the 2012 Summer Olympics
 Dominican Republic at the 2016 Summer Olympics

Dominican Republic at the Pan American Games 

Dominican Republic at the Pan American Games
 Dominican Republic at the 1991 Pan American Games
 Dominican Republic at the 1995 Pan American Games
 Dominican Republic at the 1999 Pan American Games
 Dominican Republic at the 2003 Pan American Games
 Dominican Republic at the 2007 Pan American Games
 Dominican Republic at the 2011 Pan American Games
 Dominican Republic at the 2015 Pan American Games

Dominican Republic at the Paralympics 

Dominican Republic at the Paralympics
 Dominican Republic at the 1992 Summer Paralympics
 Dominican Republic at the 1996 Summer Paralympics
 Dominican Republic at the 2004 Summer Paralympics
 Dominican Republic at the 2008 Summer Paralympics
 Dominican Republic at the 2012 Summer Paralympics
 Dominican Republic at the 2016 Summer Paralympics

Rugby Union in the Dominican Republic 

Rugby union in the Dominican Republic
 Dominican Rugby Federation
 Dominican Republic national rugby union team

Shooting in the Dominican Republic 

 Dominican Republic Shooting Federation

Softball in the Dominican Republic 

 Dominican Republic men's national softball team
 Dominican Republic women's national softball team

Swimming in the Dominican Republic 

 Dominican Republic records in swimming

Tennis in the Dominican Republic 

 Dominican Republic Davis Cup team
 Dominican Republic Fed Cup team

Volleyball in the Dominican Republic 

 Dominican Republic men's national volleyball team
 Dominican Republic women's national volleyball team
 Dominican Republic Volleyball Federation
 Dominican Republic Volleyball League
 2008 Dominican Republic Volleyball League
 Dominican Republic National Beach Volleyball Tour

Weightlifting in the Dominican Republic 

 Dominican Republic Weightlifting Federation

Wrestling in the Dominican Republic 

 WWC Dominican Republic Heavyweight Championship

Other sports events 

 Dominican Republic at the 2010 Central American and Caribbean Games
 Dominican Republic at the 2010 Summer Youth Olympics
 Dominican Republic at the 2014 Summer Youth Olympics
 Dominican Republic at the 2011 Parapan American Games
 Dominican Republic at the 2014 FEI World Equestrian Games
 Dominican Republic at the 2015 Summer Universiade

Economy and infrastructure of the Dominican Republic 

Economy of the Dominican Republic
 Agriculture in the Dominican Republic
 Coffee production in the Dominican Republic
 Irrigation in the Dominican Republic
 Banking in the Dominican Republic
 Banks in the Dominican Republic
 Central Bank of the Dominican Republic
 Economic rank, by nominal GDP (2007): 76th (seventy-sixth)
 Communications in the Dominican Republic
 Media in the Dominican Republic
 Newspapers in the Dominican Republic
 Dominican Today
 Dominican Postal Institute – provides postal service and email
 Telecommunications in the Dominican Republic
 Internet in the Dominican Republic
 Telephone numbers in the Dominican Republic
 Companies of the Dominican Republic
 Banks of the Dominican Republic
Currency of the Dominican Republic: Peso
ISO 4217: DOP
 Energy in the Dominican Republic
 Electricity sector in the Dominican Republic
 List of dams and reservoirs in Dominican Republic
 Tourism in the Dominican Republic
 Water supply and sanitation in the Dominican Republic
 Irrigation in the Dominican Republic
 Water resources management in the Dominican Republic
 Dams and reservoirs in Dominican Republic

Transport in the Dominican Republic 
 Transport in the Dominican Republic
 Air transport in the Dominican Republic
 Airlines of the Dominican Republic
 Defunct airlines of Dominican Republic
 Airports in the Dominican Republic
 Azua Dominican Field
 Busiest airports in Dominican Republic
 Rail transport in the Dominican Republic
 Vehicular transport in the Dominican Republic
 Roads in the Dominican Republic
 Highways and routes in the Dominican Republic

Education in the Dominican Republic 

Education in the Dominican Republic
 Schools in the Dominican Republic
 Universities in the Dominican Republic
 Dominican Adventist University
 Museums in the Dominican Republic

Health in the Dominican Republic 

 HIV/AIDS in the Dominican Republic
 Hospitals in the Dominican Republic
 Hospital General de la Plaza de la Salud
 Hospital Metropolitano de Santiago
 Hospital San Nicolás de Bari

See also

Index of Dominican Republic-related articles
List of international rankings
Outline of geography
Outline of North America

References

External links

 Official website of the Ministry of Tourism of the Dominican Republic
 Presidency of the Dominican Republic 
 Ministry of Tourism of the Dominican Republic
 World Bank Dominican Republic
 Dominican Republic Weather Information
 
 
 
 Dominican Republic. The World Factbook. Central Intelligence Agency.

Dominican Republic